Yeltsin Delfino Álvarez Castro (born 2 November 1994), is a Guatemalan professional football player who plays as a midfielder for Liga Nacional club  Cobán Imperial and the Guatemalan national team.

He debuted internationally in a friendly match on 15 August 2018 in a 3–0 victory against Cuba.

On 16 November 2019, Álvarez scored his first goal for Guatemala against Puerto Rico in a 5–0 victory promoting his team to League B in the CONCACAF Nations League.

International career

International goals
Scores and results list Guatemala's goal tally first.

Honours
Cobán Imperial 
Liga Nacional de Guatemala: Apertura 2022

References

1994 births
Living people
Guatemalan footballers
Guatemala international footballers
Association football defenders
C.D. Guastatoya players
Cobán Imperial players